Gaziantep Basketbol is a professional basketball team based in the city of Gaziantep in Turkey that plays in the Turkish Basketball Super League. Their home arena is the Karataş Şahinbey Sport Hall with a capacity of 6,400 seats.

History
The team was founded in 2007. In 2011 the club promoted to the Second Division. In the 2011–12 season, the team promoted to the top tier TBL. In 2012, Royal Halı (a Turkish carpet producer) became head sponsor of the team and the team was re-named to Royal Halı Gaziantep. After the 2015–16 season, the team had financial problems after Royal Halı withdrew and was forced to leave the top tier. After all, the team was able to stay alive and play in the TBL.

Honours
EuroChallenge:
Third (1): 2013–14

Logos

Season by season

 Cancelled due to the COVID-19 pandemic in Europe.

Players

Current roster

Depth chart

Notable players

References

External links 
 Official Website 
 Eurobasket.com Profile
 TBLStat.net Profile
 2015-16 FIBA Europe Cup Profile
 2013-14 FIBA EuroChallenge Profile

2007 establishments in Turkey
Basketball teams established in 2007
Basketball teams in Turkey
Sport in Gaziantep
Turkish Basketball Super League teams